Paul Coppens (1 April 1888 – 31 May 1946) was a French racing cyclist. He rode in the 1921 Tour de France.

References

1888 births
1946 deaths
French male cyclists
Place of birth missing